Arthur Sasse was an American UPI photographer. In 1948, his pictures were exhibited at a show at the Bronx Zoo.

He is best known for his photo of Albert Einstein sticking his tongue out. The photo was taken on March 14, 1951, after Einstein's 72nd birthday celebration at The Princeton Club. He made the iconic shot, but the other photographers surrounding the car missed it. The appropriateness of the photo was heavily debated by Sasse's editors before being published on International News Photos Network. It became one of the most popular photos ever taken of Einstein, who himself requested nine prints for his personal use.

The picture showed a "nutty professor" and playful side of Einstein rather than the serious one that many assumed about the man.

The picture became so popular that it was widely reproduced on posters and stickers. The original picture was auctioned off for $72,300, making it the most expensive Einstein photograph ever sold.

References

American photographers
Year of birth missing
Year of death missing